The Legnanese, or Urban Conglomerate of Legnano, is an urban area that corresponds to the Alto Milanese.

The population density is very high, reaching 1850 inhabits per square kilometer.

Comunes
 Legnano
 Parabiago
 Nerviano
 San Giorgio su Legnano
 Canegrate
 San Vittore Olona
 Villa Cortese
 Rescaldina
 Dairago
 Cerro Maggiore

Geography of Lombardy
Legnano